The Manitoba Female Hockey League is an under-18 ice hockey league in the province of Manitoba, Canada.  It is designated as an 'AAA' league – the highest level of minor hockey in Canada – and operates under the supervision of Hockey Manitoba.

History
The league was founded in 2008 to provide elite female hockey players in Manitoba with the opportunity to play at a more competitive level.  A number of players who have played in the league have joined NCAA or CIS hockey programs.   The league was built using the same model used by Hockey Manitoba for the Manitoba Midget 'AAA' Hockey League, which has been operating quite successfully since the 1980s.  Manitoba was the last western province to have a female under-18 'AAA' league.

Teams
The league began its inaugural season with five teams; it had as many as nine team (2011–12), but now has seven.  All teams are regionally based and are operated by Hockey Manitoba's regional minor hockey associations.  Each team is composed of players from local minor hockey associations within its region.

Former Teams

Brandon Wheat Kings
Parkland Panthers
Norman Wild

Championship
Since the 2011–12 season, the league championship has doubled as the provincial female under-18 AAA championship.  Each year, the Manitoba champion competes in an interprovincial playoff series against the champion from Saskatchewan.  The winner of that series earns a berth in the Esso Cup, the national female under-18 championship.

The Pembina Valley Hawks were national champions in 2012, while the Westman Wildcats won the inaugural Esso Cup in 2009, prior to joining the league.  Pembina Valley hosted the 2017 Esso Cup in Morden.

League Champions

2008-09 Pembina Valley Hawks
2009-10 Pembina Valley Hawks
2010-11 Pembina Valley Hawks
2011-12 Pembina Valley Hawks National Champions
2012-13 Pembina Valley Hawks
2013-14 Pembina Valley Hawks
2014-15 Central Plains Capitals
2015-16 Yellowhead Chiefs
2016-17 Pembina Valley Hawks (Westman Wildcats advanced to regional playoff)
2017-18 Eastman Selects
2018-19 Westman Wildcats
2019-20 Winnipeg Ice/Winnipeg Avros
(tie due to Covid-19)
2020-21 No Champion (Covid-19)
2021-22 Westman Wildcats

See also
Hockey Manitoba
Manitoba U-18 'AAA' Hockey League
Esso Cup

External links
League Website

References

Hockey Manitoba
2008 establishments in Manitoba
Women's ice hockey leagues in Canada
Ice hockey leagues in Manitoba
Sports leagues established in 2008
Youth ice hockey leagues in Canada
Women in Manitoba